Paradoxopla is a genus of moths in the family Lasiocampidae. The genus was erected by Yves de Lajonquière in 1976. It is found from India to Taiwan.

Species and subspecies
Based on the Global Biodiversity Information Facility:
Paradoxopla bicrenulata Bethune-Baker, 1915
Paradoxopla cardinalis Holloway, 1987
Paradoxopla sinuata Moore, 1879
Paradoxopla sinuata orientalis de Lajonquière, 1976
Paradoxopla sinuata sinuata
Paradoxopla undulifera Walker, 1855

References

Lasiocampidae